Maxine L. Margolis is an American anthropologist and an inductee of the American Academy of Arts and Sciences.  She is a professor of anthropology at the University of Florida in Gainesville, and has been with the university since 1970. Margolis holds a Ph.D. in anthropology from Columbia University. Margolis received the BRASA Lifetime Contribution Award in 2014.

She was a student and then a colleague of Marvin Harris, and was one of those responsible for convincing him to leave Columbia University for the University of Florida in 1980. Margolis's work is strongly informed by Harris's anthropological research strategy, known as cultural materialism.

Margolis is the author of many books on anthropology, notably Little Brazil, True to Her Nature: Changing Advice to American Women, and An Invisible Minority: Brazilians in New York City.

With Martin F. Murphy she edited Science, Materialism, and the Study of Culture, the most comprehensive collection of writings by anthropologists strongly influenced by cultural materialism to date.

Margolis's research interests include gender, agriculture, Brazil and Brazilian immigrants to the United States. In December 2005 she was cited in a New York Times article Trading Status for a Raise, and appears in the companion piece, a New York Times video report " Brazil in Queens.

Margolis is married to archeologist Jerald T. Milanich and the mother of historian Nara Milanich.

Recent books
 Goodbye Brazil: Émigrés from the Land of Soccer and Samba. Madison WI: University of Wisconsin Press (2013)
 Goodbye Brazil: Imigrantes Brasileiros no Mundo. São Paulo, Editora Contexto (2013).
 An Invisible Minority: Brazilian Immigrants in New York City. Gainesville, FL University Press of Florida (2009)
 True to Her Nature: Changing Advice to American Women Prospect Heights, IL.: Waveland Press (2000 )
  Little Brazil: An Ethnography of Brazilian Immigrants in New York City  Princeton: Princeton University (1994)
  Little Brazil: Imigrantes Brasileiros em Nova York, Portuguese edition of Little Brazil: An Ethnography of Brazilian Immigrants in New York City. Campinas, São Paulo: Papirus Editora (1994)
   Science, Materialism and the Study of Culture: Readings in Cultural Materialism, co-edited with Martin F. Murphy. Gainesville: University Press of Florida (1995)
 An Invisible Minority: Brazilians Immigrants in New York City rev.ed, Gainesville: University Press of Florida (2009)
 Women in Fundamentalism: Modesty, Marriage and Motherhood, Rowman & Littlefield (2020)

References

External links 
 University of Florida page
 New York Times article on Brazilian immigrants

American women anthropologists
Year of birth missing (living people)
Living people
Columbia Graduate School of Arts and Sciences alumni
University of Florida faculty
Brazilianists